Kümbet is a village in the Gölpazarı District, Bilecik Province, Turkey. Its population is 67 (2021).

References

Villages in Gölpazarı District